The Diving Board is the twenty-ninth studio album by English musician Elton John. It is the second of his studio releases since 1979's Victim of Love without any of his regular band members. The album was released in the United Kingdom on 16 September 2013 and debuted at No. 3 on the UK album chart, his highest-charting studio album in his home country since 2001's Songs from the West Coast, and at No. 4 on the Billboard 200. It is also his highest-charting solo album in the United States since Blue Moves in 1976.

The album's premiere single, "Home Again", was released on 24 June 2013, the same day the album became available for pre-order. On 28 August 2013, a video for "Mexican Vacation (Kids in the Candlelight)" was released on YouTube.

Production 
The album was written by Elton John and Bernie Taupin and produced in Los Angeles by The Union producer T-Bone Burnett. Burnett suggested that John return to the piano, bass, and drums format of his very early years and the result, John says, is "the most exciting solo record I've done in a long, long time." The Diving Board was initially written in two days.

The album's release date was pushed back; though the record was originally planned for release in the fall of 2012, it was revealed on Taupin's website that it would instead be released in February 2013 for promotional reasons. Later, it was pushed back again.

It was revealed on 28 September 2012 in Rolling Stone magazine that John was dissatisfied with the balance on the album and that he had started to write more new songs for the album. He believed that many of the songs had a theme and that he wanted to write more songs after sitting on the project for so long.

During a concert at the Perth Arena in Perth, Australia on 10 November 2012, John revealed that The Diving Boards release would be pushed back further, to May 2013. The delay in release was because John was to record more material for the album with Burnett in January 2013.

On 8 January 2013 it was revealed by Taupin's website that the title of the album had been changed from The Diving Board to Voyeur.

An article on Billboard published on 23 February 2013 revealed that the release date had once again been pushed back, this time until September 2013; the title of the album was back to The Diving Board again. The article also revealed the revised track list, which includes four new songs mixed in with the original material. A song originally stated for release on the album, titled "5th Avenue", had been dropped. John called the revised album "The most piano-oriented album of my career" and said "It's my most adult album". In total, the album's release had been pushed back four times.

The album's premiere single "Home Again" was released on 24 June 2013, the same day the album became available for pre-order.

On 28 August 2013, a video for "Mexican Vacation (Kids in the Candlelight)" was released on YouTube, being the album's second single.

Reception

Critical
The Diving Board received generally positive reviews from music critics. At Metacritic, which assigns a normalised rating out of 100 to reviews from mainstream critics, the album received an average score of 71, which indicates "generally favorable reviews", based on 24 reviews.

Many critics praise the album as a "great return to form" and one of John's best albums of recent years and of his career. Alan Light of Rolling Stone gave the album a four star review commending its spare instrumentation and focus, saying that John has "regained his sense of musical possibility and taken a brave, graceful jump". Robert Hilburn, who famously reviewed John's American debut at the Troubadour in Los Angeles, praised The Diving Board's "finely crafted and deeply moving" songs that celebrate the past in a "fresh and revealing" manner. Hilburn goes on to say that if these songs had been played at the Troubadour in 1970, John would still have been "showered with applause and acclaim".  Stephen Thomas Erlewine of Allmusic was less enthusiastic.  In a mixed review, he stated that the album is an "exceptional idea in theory; in practice it is ever so slightly formless."

Commercial
In the United Kingdom, The Diving Board reached No. 3 on the album chart on its first week of release behind indie rock band Arctic Monkeys and Swedish dance music producer Avicii, selling 22,000 copies in its first week. The album was certified Silver by the British Phonographic Industry on 10 January 2014, signifying sales of 60,000 copies in the UK. In the United States, the album debuted at  No. 4 on the Billboard 200 albums chart on its first week, with 47,000 copies sold.  It is Elton John's 18th top 10 album on the chart.  As of December 2015, the album has sold 150,000 copies in the US. It also debuted at No. 7 on the Canadian Albums chart.
 
The single  "Can't Stay Alone Tonight" became Elton John's 70th song to appear on the Adult Contemporary chart in the US, further extending his record for the most appearances on that chart that first began with "Your Song" in 1970.

Accolades
Rolling Stone placed the album at No. 25 on its list of the 50 Best Albums of 2013.

Track listing

Release history

Editions
Standard edition: 15-track album
Deluxe edition: 19-track album
Super deluxe edition: 19-track album with DVD Live from Capitol Recording Studios [not available as MP3]
Double LP
Amazon.com USA exclusive edition: Deluxe album with a reproduction of 1970 Troubadour Concert Poster
Walmart.com USA exclusive edition: Deluxe album with a bonus DVD of Live at Bud Walton Arena in Fayetteville, AR, June 2013 For Walmart Shareholders
Target.com USA exclusive edition: 2CD version with three session tracks. Two unavailable on any other format
BestBuy.com USA exclusive edition: Deluxe album with a bonus DVD of the making of The Million Dollar Piano Show
Japanese exclusive edition: SHM 2CD version with three session tracks. Two unavailable on any other format

Personnel 
 Elton John – acoustic piano, lead vocals (1-4, 6-10, 12, 13, 15)
 Keefus Ciancia – keyboards (2, 3, 4, 6-10, 12)
 Larry Goldings – Hammond B3 organ (15)
 Doyle Bramhall II – guitars (3, 10)
 Raphael Saadiq – bass (2, 3, 4, 6, 7, 8, 10, 12-15)
 David Plitch – bass (9)
 Jay Bellerose – drums (2, 3, 4, 6-10, 12-15)
 Jack Ashford – tambourine (3, 4, 7, 8, 10, 13)
 George Bohanon – baritone horn (9), trombone (12, 15), euphonium (12, 15)
 Bruce Fowler – trombone (9)
 Ira Nepus – trombone (12, 15)
 Chuck Findley – flugelhorn (9)
 Darrell Leonard – flugelhorn (9, 12, 15), horn arrangements (9, 12, 15, trumpet (12)
 William Roper – tuba (9, 12, 15)
 Stjepan Hauser – cello (2, 4, 12)
 Luka Šulić – cello (2, 4, 12)
 Bill Maxwell – BGV arrangements (3, 4, 7, 10, 13)
 Bill Cantos – backing vocals (3, 4, 7, 10, 13)
 Alvin Chea – backing vocals (3, 4, 7, 13)
 Carmel Echols – backing vocals (3, 10, 13)
 Judith Hill – backing vocals (3, 10, 13)
 Perry Morgan – backing vocals (3, 4, 7, 13)
 Louis Price – backing vocals (3, 4, 7, 13)
 Rose Stone – backing vocals (10)

Production 
 Producer – T-Bone Burnett
 Recorded and Mixed by Jason Wormer
 Second Engineers – Jeff Gartenbaum, Chris Owens and Vanessa Parr.
 Mix Assistants – Zachary Dawes and Chris Owens 
 Mixed at The Village Recorder and Olympic Studios (Los Angeles, CA).
 Mastered by Gavin Lurssen at Lurssen Mastering (Hollywood, CA).
 Equipment Technician – Zachary Dawes
 Piano Technician – Carl Lieberman
 Art Direction – Mat Maitland 
 Photography – Tim Barber
 Creative Director – Tony King

Charts

Certifications

}

References

External links

2013 albums
Elton John albums
Albums produced by T Bone Burnett
Mercury Records albums
Capitol Records albums